Felt were an English jangle pop band, formed in 1979 in Water Orton, England, and led by the mononymous Lawrence. They were active for ten years through the 1980s, releasing ten singles and ten albums. The band's name was inspired by Tom Verlaine's emphasis of the word "felt" in the Television song "Venus".

Felt have been cited as an influence by Belle and Sebastian's Stuart Murdoch and Tim Burgess of the Charlatans, as well as by alternative rock bands Manic Street Preachers, Girls, and the Tyde.

History

Formation 
Lawrence founded the band in 1979 with the release of the single "Index", a self-published solo recording. A noisy effort unlike Felt's subsequent records, it was later awarded single of the week by Dave McCullough in music newspaper Sounds.

With Lawrence initially on vocals and guitar, they formed properly in 1980 with the addition of schoolfriend Nick Gilbert on drums and local guitarist Maurice Deebank. Becoming co-writer with Lawrence, Deebank's jangly, classical-influenced style of playing would provide the band's signature sound in its early years.

The band performed as a trio before deciding that bass guitar was needed. Gilbert switched to bass and drummer Tony Race was added. He was replaced soon after by Gary Ainge who would remain the only constant member besides Lawrence throughout the rest of Felt's existence, as well as the only member to play on all ten of their albums.

Signing 
Felt signed to Cherry Red Records and their first single as a band, "Something Sends Me to Sleep", was released in 1981. Their first album, Crumbling the Antiseptic Beauty, followed the next year. Gilbert left and was replaced on bass by Mick Lloyd. The band's lineup would then remain unchanged through their next two albums, The Splendour of Fear and The Strange Idols Pattern and Other Short Stories. In 1982, the Felt song "My Face Is on Fire" appeared on the best-selling Pillows & Prayers compilation.

In 1985, for the recording of their fourth album, keyboard player Martin Duffy was added and Marco Thomas became bassist. Ignite the Seven Cannons was produced by Robin Guthrie of the Cocteau Twins and featured Elizabeth Fraser on the single "Primitive Painters". The song reached the top of the UK independent singles chart.

Deebank departed soon after, prompting a shift in Felt's sound with Duffy's keyboards becoming more central. The lead guitar position would subsequently be filled by an ever-changing succession of players.

The band moved to Creation Records in 1986 and released Let the Snakes Crinkle Their Heads to Death, the first of two instrumental albums they would record. Their next album, Forever Breathes the Lonely Word, was a conventional collection of songs that gained the band praise and would become regarded by many as their best.

Break up and later 
In 1989, Lawrence declared it had been his intention all along to release ten singles and ten albums in ten years and, having done so, announced the end of Felt. After releasing their last album, Me and a Monkey on the Moon, and undertaking a short tour, the band split up. Lawrence went on to form Denim and later, Go Kart Mozart and Mozart Estate. Duffy joined Primal Scream. Ainge would later play with Vic Godard. Mick Lloyd died in 2016. Subsequent bass player Mick Bund died in 2017. Martin Duffy died in 2022.

In 2018, Cherry Red reissued all ten Felt albums on CD and vinyl, with new mixes of songs plus revised tracklistings and packaging.

Members
Lawrence – vocals, guitars (1979–1989)
Maurice Deebank – guitars (1980–1985)
Nick Gilbert – bass, drums (1980–1981)
Tony Race – drums (1980–1981)
Gary Ainge – drums, percussion (1981–1989)
Martin Duffy – keyboards (1985–1989; died 2022)
Mick Lloyd – bass (1982–1984; died 2016)
Marco Thomas – bass, guitars (1985–1987)
Phil King – bass (1986-1987)
Mick Bund – bass (1988; died 2017)

Timeline

Discography

Crumbling the Antiseptic Beauty (1982)
The Splendour of Fear (1984)
The Strange Idols Pattern and Other Short Stories (1984)
Ignite the Seven Cannons (1985)
Let the Snakes Crinkle Their Heads to Death (1986)
Forever Breathes the Lonely Word (1986)
Poem of the River (1987)
The Pictorial Jackson Review (1988)
Train Above the City (1988)
Me and a Monkey on the Moon (1989)

References

Further reading

External links
"Felt Tribute Site"
"Felt" - article at Perfect Sound Forever
"Felt Biography" at TweeNet
Felt Discography
Felt Discography - featuring detailed pictures
Felt Reviews

Cherry Red Records artists
Creation Records artists
English alternative rock groups
Jangle pop groups
British indie pop groups
English post-punk music groups
Dream pop musical groups
Musical groups from Birmingham, West Midlands
Musical groups established in 1979
Musical groups disestablished in 1989
1979 establishments in England
1989 disestablishments in England